Brays Grove Community School was a mixed secondary school located within the town of Harlow in Essex, England.

The school was closed in 2008 due to falling pupil numbers in the town. The site was subsequently demolished and a rebuilt Passmores Academy occupied the site from 2012.

Notable former pupils
Stephanie de Sykes, singer

References

Defunct schools in Essex
Educational institutions disestablished in 2008
2008 disestablishments in England
Demolished buildings and structures in England